State Road 466 (NM 466) is a  state highway in the US state of New Mexico. NM 466's southern terminus is at County Route 58D in Santa Fe, and the northern terminus is at NM 14 in Santa Fe.

History

NM 466 was created in the mid-1980s, established on St. Michaels Drive from NM 14 to U.S. Route 84 (US 84) which replaced former US 85 Bypass. In the mid-1990s US 285 was rerouted from Old Pecos Trail to along US 84 (St. Francis Drive). At that time NM 466 was extended along Old Pecos Trail to its current southern terminus.

Major intersections

See also

References

466
Transportation in Santa Fe County, New Mexico
U.S. Route 85
Santa Fe, New Mexico